Newton-John is a surname. Notable people with the surname include:

Emerson Newton-John (born 1974), American racing driver
Olivia Newton-John (1948–2022), English-born Australian singer, songwriter and actress

See also
Newton (surname)
John (surname)

Compound surnames